The  2020–21 Moroccan Women's Championship Division One, is the first season of Moroccan top tier of women's football under its new professional format.

Teams

League table

Results

See also
2020–21 Moroccan Women's Championship Division Two
2019–20 Moroccan Women's Throne Cup
2020–21 Botola

References

Women's football in Morocco